Angela Ekaette is a Nigerian ballet dancer best known for co-hosting the UK version of Wheel of Fortune for its first series in 1988 and three celebrity specials before being replaced by Carol Smillie. Around that time, she also appeared on Bazaar, and was the consultant for the 4Learning show "Equal Voice".

References

Year of birth missing (living people)
Living people
Nigerian female dancers
Nigerian ballet dancers